Poly(methyl acrylate) (PMA) is a family of organic polymers with the formulan. It is a synthetic acrylate polymer derived from methyl acrylate monomer. The polymers are colorless.  This homopolymer is far less important than copolymers derived from methyl acrylate and other monomers. PMA is softer than polymethyl methacrylate (PMMA), It  is tough, leathery, and flexible.

Copolymers
Far more important than PMA are copolymers produced from methyl acrylate and one or more of the following comonomers methyl methacrylate, styrene, acrylonitrile, vinyl acetate, vinyl chloride, [[vinylidene
chloride]], and butadiene.

Properties
It has a low glass-transition temperature about 10°C (12.5°C in case of PMA38). It is soluble in dimethyl sulfoxide (DMSO). PMA is water-sensitive and unlike PMMA, is not stable against alkalies.

High-energy radiation leads to cross linking in PMA. However in polymethyl methacrylate (PMMA), a compound similar to PMA, degradation occurs instead.

Uses
Also used in leather finishing and textiles.

Derivatives of this polymer are commonly used in orally administerd pharmaceutical formulations to target specific regions of the gastrointestinal tract.

References

Acrylate polymers